Pharo is an open source programming language.

Pharo may also refer to:

 a German name for Faro, a card game
 Pharo Management, a hedge fund established in 2000
 Helge Pharo (born 1943), Norwegian historian
 Kgakgamotso Pharo (born 1982), Botswana footballer

See also
 Pharo House, Middletown, Delaware, United States, a home on the National Register of Historic Places
 Palais du Pharo, a palace in Marseille, France
 Faro (disambiguation)
 Pharos (disambiguation)
 Pharaoh (disambiguation)